Promissum is an extinct genus of conodonts, primitive chordates, that lived during the Upper Ordovician period.

A conodont, Promissum had a primitive mouth under its eyes with mineralized teeth, which are both typical for conodonts. It had a primitive backbone and probably looked like a small eel or large worm, lacking any kind of fins except for perhaps a small one on the tail. It was relatively large for a conodont, reaching about 40 cm (16 inch) in length.

Well-preserved specimens were discovered in the Soom shale of South Africa in 1994.

Promissum was probably capable of maintaining a cruising speed, but not of bursts of speed.

References

External links 
 Promissum at fossilworks. org (retrieved 30 April 2016)

Prioniodontida genera
Ordovician conodonts
Transitional fossils
Prehistoric fish of Africa
Fossil taxa described in 1995
Soom Shale fossils